Michael Dixon Smith  is an American-born Canadian chef and cookbook writer. He has hosted The Inn Chef, Chef at Home, and judged on Chopped: Canada on the Canadian Food Network. Smith is Prince Edward Island's Food Ambassador, a nutritional activist, and an advocate for sustainable home cooking and farm-to-table cuisine.

Career 
At age seventeen, Smith started cooking in kitchens while attending art school. Within five years he was the Head Chef at a large, upscale bistro. He then enrolled at The Culinary Institute of America, where he graduated second in his class. After graduation, Smith worked in Michelin three-star restaurants in Europe, as well as kitchens in South Africa, the Caribbean, and New York City.

Smith relocated to Prince Edward Island with the desire to cook sustainably by building a garden and developing partnerships with local farmers and fishermen. Smith started as a chef at The Inn at Bay Fortune in 1991. His first television show, The Inn Chef (1998), was filmed on location at the Inn, and across Nova Scotia and Prince Edward Island.

Smith lead the team that cooked for athletes in Whistler, British Columbia during the 2010 Vancouver Olympics.

With his wife and business partner Chastity, Smith purchased The Inn at Bay Fortune in 2015. FireWorks, the on site restaurant, practices sustainable cuisine by growing its own vegetables in the surrounding gardens and sourcing local seafood.

In 2019, Smith was appointed to the Order of Canada as a member "for his contributions as a chef, entrepreneur and champion of local foods, as well as for his efforts to develop regional tourism." In the same year, the Smiths opened a sister property, The Inn at Fortune Bridge.

Personal life
In 2009, Smith created a five-year scholarship for students in the Family and Nutritional Sciences Program at the University of Prince Edward Island. 

On August 17, 2013, Smith married Chastity Smith, a singer-songwriter, on Prince Edward Island, where they live with their three children Gabe, Ariella, and Camille. Smith is a collector of vintage maps.

Filmography

Bibliography

Cookbooks
Open Kitchen: A Chef's Day at The Inn at Bay Fortune (1998)
The Inn Chef: Creative Ingredients, Sensational Flavors (1999)
Chef Michael Smith's Kitchen: 100 of My Favourite Easy Recipes (2011)
The Best of Chef at Home: Essential Recipes for Today's Kitchen (2011)
Chef at Home (2011)
Fast Flavours: 110 Simple Speedy Recipes (2012)
Back To Basics: 100 Simple Classic Recipes With a Twist (2013)
Family Meals: 100 Easy Everyday Recipes (2014)
Make Ahead Meals: Over 100 Easy Time-Saving Recipes (2015)
Real Food, Real Good: Eat Well With Over 100 of My Simple, Wholesome Recipes (2016)
Farm, Fire & Feast: Recipes from The Inn at Bay Fortune (2021)

References

External links

Food Network Canada biography (archived copy taken March 28, 2014 from the original URL)

1966 births
Living people
21st-century Canadian male writers
American emigrants to Canada
American expatriates in Canada
American male chefs
Canadian cookbook writers
Canadian restaurateurs
Canadian male chefs
Canadian television chefs
Chefs from New York (state)
Chefs from New York City
Culinary Institute of America alumni
Food Network chefs
Members of the Order of Canada
Rochester Institute of Technology alumni
Writers from New York City
Writers from Prince Edward Island